Marchelli is an Italian surname. Notable people with the surname include:

Carla Marchelli (born 1935), Italian alpine skier
Maria Grazia Marchelli (1932–2006), Italian alpine skier
Rolando Marchelli (1664–?), Italian Baroque painter

Italian-language surnames